Draba corrugata is a species of flowering plant in the family Brassicaceae known by the common name Southern California draba.

It is native to the eastern Transverse Ranges of southern California, and the Peninsular Ranges of Southern California and Baja California. It grows in rocky areas.

Draba corrugata is a biennial or perennial herb forming a cushiony basal clump of leaves.

The erect inflorescence may bear over 100 mustardlike flowers with yellow petals each under  in length. The fruit is an oval-shaped, twisted silique containing many seeds.

Varieties
There are two varieties of this species:
Draba corrugata var. corrugata is the more common variety, found in Southern and Baja California.
Draba corrugata var. saxosa, the rarer variety, is known only from the San Bernardino Mountains in San Bernardino County, and the San Gabriel Mountains in San Bernardino and Los Angeles Counties, Southern California.

References

External links
Jepson Manual Treatment — Draba corrugata
USDA Plants Profile
Calflora: Draba corrugata
Draba corrugata — U.C. Photo gallery

corrugata
Flora of California
Flora of Baja California
Natural history of the California chaparral and woodlands
Natural history of the Peninsular Ranges
Natural history of the Transverse Ranges